Lopper Tunnel may refer to:

 Lopper I Rail Tunnel, a Swiss rail tunnel connecting Hergiswil with Alpnach as part of the Brünig line
 Lopper II Rail Tunnel, a Swiss rail tunnel connecting Hergiswil with Stans as part of the Luzern–Stans–Engelberg line
 Lopper Road Tunnel, a Swiss road tunnel connecting Hergiswil with Alpnach as part of the A8 motorway